Nwe Yin Win (born Joyce Win on 23 April 1945) is a Burmese singer, considered one of the pioneers of modern Burmese pop music. Nwe Yin Win was born in Sagaing to parents a Bamar father Min Swe (also known as Win Maung) and an Anglo-Burmese mother "Cathy" Tin Tin Hla. She attended the English-speaking St. Francis Girls' School (today's Tamwe 4 High School) and St. Philomena's Convent High School (Sanchaung 2 High School). In 1967, she graduated from Rangoon University with a degree in English before getting a master's degree (MEd) in 1973 at the Rangoon Institute of Education. During her time in college, she began dabbling with a music career.

She was one of the most popular singers in Myanmar in the 1970s, known for her Burmese language covers of American country and pop songs. Before her career in entertainment, she was a university lecturer in English. She continues to make records, even dabbling into Burmese hip hop, and continues to perform in musical concerts.

Album discography 
Nwe Yin Win recorded many songs in the 1970s, when official named albums were rarely released in Myanmar. The following is a partial list of her later releases.

 A Chit So Tar (1981)
 Gypsy A Chit (1982)
 Shwe Tharahpu Thi Chin Myar (1982)
 Nwe Yin Win Thi Chin Myar (1983)
 An Ta Yel (1993)
 More Than I Can Say (1995)
 Nwe Myo Sone Lin (1996)
 Ma Nae Maung (A Kaung Sone Tay Myar) (1997)
 Shwe Pin Lae Nae A Kaung Sone Tay Myar (2000)
 Hnit 40 Kha Yee... A Shi A Tine (2005)
 Thi Chin Ma Shi Yin A Chit Ma Shi... 45 Hnit Kha Yee (2010)

References

External links
 

1945 births
Living people
Anglo-Burmese people
20th-century Burmese women singers
People from Sagaing Region
University of Yangon alumni